A codrug or "mutual prodrug" consists of two synergistic drugs chemically linked together to a single molecule, in order to improve the drug delivery properties of one or both drugs.

An effective codrug should be pharmacologically inactive in its own right but should release the constituent drugs upon biochemical breakage of the chemical linkage at the target tissue where their therapeutic effects are needed. As such, the chemical linkage (usually a covalent bond) should be subjectable to biodegradation, such as hydrolysis, by an enzymatic or non-enzymatic mechanism. The differential distribution of enzymes capable of catalyzing the breakage of the chemical linkage in different tissues may be exploited to achieve tissue-specific metabolism of the codrug to release the constituent drugs.    

The constituent drugs are indicated for the same disease but may exert different therapeutic effects via disparate mechanisms of action.

Motivation 

Development of Anticancer Codrugs [3]:
The disadvantages associated with the co-delivery of physically combined chemotherapeutic drugs/agents often suffer from poor solubility, less membrane permeability, unimproved bioavailability, as well as poor selectivity for the targeted cells. Simply we can say that physically combine drugs always struggles with less improved pharmacokinetic properties. Where selectivity is a major issue in the complex environment of a targeted cell. 
Several codrugs reported in the literature for the anticancer drug delivery with improved pharmacokinetic properties may provide ideas to the pharmaceutical scientist for further drug development in various diseases.
Codrug of butyric acid and ATRA,
Codrug of ATRA and histone deacetylase inhibitors,
5-Fluorouracil (5-FU) and cytarabine (Ara-C) codrug,
Paclitaxel and captopril codrug,
5-Fluorouracil and diazeniumdiolate codrug,

Common codrugs

 Benorylate — esterified paracetamol and acetylsalicylic acid
 Fenethylline — amphetamine chemically linked with theophylline
 Lisdexamfetamine — a substituted amphetamine with an amide linkage formed by the condensation of dextroamphetamine with the carboxylate group of the essential amino acid L-lysine.
 Sulfasalazine — sulfapyridine chemically linked to 5-aminosalicylic acid coupled with an azo linkage. It is on the World Health Organization's List of Essential Medicines.
 Sultamicillin — esterified ampicillin/sulbactam.

References